Milly-Lamartine is a commune in the Saône-et-Loire department in the region of Bourgogne-Franche-Comté in eastern France. It is the home-town of Alphonse de Lamartine, the famous French poet and writer.

See also
Communes of the Saône-et-Loire department

References

Communes of Saône-et-Loire